Centennial Park Golf Centre is a 27-hole executive length golf course located in Southern Ontario on the border of Etobicoke and Mississauga. The facility also features a driving range, putting green, chipping green and an 18-hole mini-golf course. The golf course is privately owned but is open to the public. They operate on a first-come, first-served basis.  Their hours of operation are generally within 30 mins of sunrise and sunset, weather permitting.  Although weather dictates the season, the course generally opens around the beginning of April and closes the beginning of December.

History
The facility opened on June 30, 1987 as an 18-hole golf course. Dr. Michael Hurdzan designed the course. PGA golf professional Larry Mize was on hand at the opening of the course to play a round in front of hundreds of fans who crowded the grounds. Mize won the 1987 Masters Championship just a few months earlier. The third 9-hole course was built later and opened on June 1, 2001

Course
The golf course has three 9-hole courses, each consisting of three par 4s and six par 3s. There are three tee decks on each course, the blue being the back tees, the whites in the middle tees, and the red being the front tee decks. Centennial has grown a reputation to have their greens in superb condition.

Practice Facilities
The facility sports a 34-stall driving range consisting of both grass and turf surfaces to hit off. The driving range is over 350 yards for the long hitters. There are target greens and bunkers for golfers to aim at while hitting their irons and wedges.

The course has a 3400 square-foot putting green with various pin placements to practice every type of putt possible.

There is also a 7500 square-foot chipping green including a bunker for players to practice all different types of chip shots and really work on their short game.

Mini-Golf
The facility offers a challenging 18-hole mini-golf course. The course has a turf surface that simulates real golf greens to give players the real putting experience. There is another surface on some of the holes to simulate rough that can slow down a player's ball a lot to make for some tough shots. There is also a lot of obstacles to make the course extremely challenging for anyone.

Clubhouse
The facility has a full-service pro shop, staffed by three CPGA (Canadian Professional Golf Association) pros selling all golf equipment and apparel needed for the sport. There is a full-service restaurant with a wide variety of food options. There is also a men's and women's washroom. 

Other clubhouse offers and rentals include:
 power carts
 pull carts
 rental clubs
 range driver rentals
 club regripping
 club repairs

Tournaments
For the last 24 years Centennial Park Golf Centre and the Toronto Firefighters have held their charity golf tournament on the last weekend of September. The tournament runs on a one-day handicapping system and there are winners in six different categories: men's and women's, senior men's and women's, and junior men's and women's. All proceeds of the tournament go to Women's Habitat.

In addition, tournaments with 20 or more golfers can be booked at the pro shop.

References

External links

Golf clubs and courses in Ontario